Artemisia rupestris is a species of plants belonging to the family Asteraceae.

Its native range is Europe to Siberia and Afghanistan.

References

rupestris